Mubarakpur is a constituency of the Uttar Pradesh Legislative Assembly covering the city of Mubarakpur in the Azamgarh district of Uttar Pradesh, India.

Mubarakpur is one of five assembly constituencies in the Azamgarh Lok Sabha constituency. Since 2008, this assembly constituency is numbered 346 amongst 403 constituencies.

Election results

2022

16th Vidhan Sabha: 2017 General Elections

Members of the Legislative Assembly

References

External links

External links
Official Site of Legislature in Uttar Pradesh
Uttar Pradesh Government website
UP Assembly

Assembly constituencies of Uttar Pradesh